Kalimantanossus is a monotypic genus of moths in the family Cossidae. Its only species, Kalimantanossus microgenitalis, was described in 2004 and is found on Borneo.

References

Natural History Museum Lepidoptera generic names catalog

Cossinae
Monotypic moth genera
Moths of Asia
Moths described in 2004